Willard is an unincorporated community in Pender County, North Carolina, United States. Willard has a post office with ZIP code 28478.

The Penderlea Homesteads Historic District was listed on the National Register of Historic Places in 2013.

References

Unincorporated communities in Pender County, North Carolina
Unincorporated communities in North Carolina